Kimberley Institute Cricket Club is an English cricket club based in Kimberley, Nottinghamshire. The club compete in the Nottinghamshire Cricket Board Premier League, which is an accredited ECB Premier League, winning the league title in 2000, 2015 and 2019.

External links
 Kimberly Institute Cricket Club - official site

English club cricket teams
Cricket in Nottinghamshire
Cricket clubs established in 1878
1878 establishments in England